Brookens is a surname. Notable people with the surname include:

Ike Brookens (born 1949), American baseball player
J. Robert Brookens (born 1950), American politician

See also
Brookins